Scotch Creek may refer to:

Scotch Creek, British Columbia, a community on Shuswap Lake
Scotch Creek (British Columbia), a creek in the Thompson River drainage